Ian H. Witten (born 4 March 1947 in Horsham, Sussex, England) is a computer scientist at the University of Waikato, New Zealand. He is a Chartered Engineer with the Institute of Electrical Engineers in London who graduated from the University of Cambridge with a BA and MA (First Class Honours) in mathematics in 1969 and an M.Sc. in mathematics and computer science from the University of Calgary, where he was a Commonwealth Scholar, in 1970.  He received his Ph.D. for Learning to Control in 1976 from the University of Essex, England (Electrical Engineering Science). Witten discovered temporal-difference learning, inventing the tabular TD(0), the first temporal-difference learning rule for reinforcement learning. Witten is a co-creator of the Sequitur algorithm
and conceived and obtained funding for the development of the original WEKA software package for data mining. 
Witten further made considerable contributions to the field of compression, creating novel algorithms for text and image compression with Alistair Moffat and Timothy C. Bell. He is also one of the major contributors to the digital libraries field, and founder of the Greenstone Digital Library Software.

Witten was elected a Fellow of the Association for Computing Machinery in 1996 and a Fellow of the 
Royal Society of New Zealand in 1997.

In 2004 he received the International Federation for Information Processing Namur Award for "contributions to the awareness of social implications of information technology, and the need for an holistic approach in the use of information technology that takes account of social implications" and in 2005 the Royal Society of New Zealand Hector Medal for contributions to many areas of computer science.

Bibliography

See also
WEKA

References

External links
 http://www.cs.waikato.ac.nz/~ihw Academic homepage

Living people
People from Hamilton, New Zealand
New Zealand computer scientists
Academic staff of the University of Calgary
Academic staff of the University of Waikato
Fellows of the Association for Computing Machinery
Fellows of the Royal Society of New Zealand
Alumni of the University of Cambridge
University of Calgary alumni
1947 births